A moire, moiré pattern or moiré fringe is an interference pattern.

Moire or Moiré may also refer to:

 Moiré, Rhône, a commune in France
 Moire (fabric), a textile with a wavy appearance
 Emmanuel Moire (born 1979), French singer
 Milo Moiré (born 1983), Swiss pornographic actress and artist

See also
 Line moiré, a type of moiré pattern
 Moiré deflectometry, produces results that appears similar to an interferometry technique
 Shape moiré, a type of moiré pattern
 Moires, a town and a former municipality in Greece
 Moir (disambiguation)